William Putnam may refer to:
William LeBaron Putnam (1835–1918), Maine lawyer and politician and United States federal judge
William Lowell Putnam (1861–1923), American lawyer and banker
Bill Putnam (1920–1989), American audio engineer
William Lowell Putnam III (1924–2014), alpinist, author and broadcasting executive
Bill Putnam (sports executive), founding owner of the Philadelphia Flyers